All 'bout Smoke 'n Mirrors is the first album from Portuguese pop rock band Fingertips. The album is characterized by its alternative sound mixed with ballad rock style. Famous singles from this album include "Picture Of My Own", "Melancholic Ballad (For The Leftlovers)" and "How Do You Know Me".

Track list 
"Picture Of My Own"
"Melancholic Ballad (For The Leftlovers)"
"How Do You Know Me"
"Even I"
"Smoke And Mirrors"
"Till I Get Me"
"Lovers Condemn"
"Safe 'n Warm"
"Lost In My Sleep"
"Escape (Shock Wave)"
"As I Was Drowning"

Personnel 

 Zé Manuel - vocals
 Rui Saraiva - bass
 Alexis Dias - guitar
 Jorge Oliveira - drums

2003 albums
Fingertips (band) albums